= Hip Hop Heresies =

2022 non-fiction book

Hip Hop Heresies: Queer Aesthetics in New York City
- Author: Shanté Paradigm Smalls
- Publisher: New York University Press
- Publication date: June 2022
- ISBN: 9781479808212
- OCLC: 1311319707

Hip Hop Heresies: Queer Aesthetics in New York City is a non-fiction book by Shanté Paradigm Smalls. It was published in 2022 by New York University Press.

== General references ==
- Kehrer, Lauron J. (2023-12-01). "Review: Hip Hop Heresies: Queer Aesthetics in New York City , by Shanté Paradigm Smalls". Journal of Popular Music Studies. 35 (4): 133–135. doi:10.1525/jpms.2023.35.4.133. ISSN 1533-1598.
- Rayo, Rocio (2023). Smalls, Shanté Paradigm (ed.). ""Mic check, one, two, one, two": Hip Hop Heresies: Queer Aesthetics in New York City". Women's Studies Quarterly. 51 (3/4): 265–267. ISSN 0732-1562.
